Albert Clinton Conner, American painter
Alexander H. Conner, American politician
Amanda Conner, American comic artist
Angela Conner, English sculptor
Bart Conner, retired American Olympian
Bruce Conner (1933–2008), American artist
Charles Franklin Conner, former United States Deputy Secretary of Agriculture
Charles Fremont Conner, American artist
Chris Conner (born 1983), American ice hockey player
Christopher C. Conner, Chief Judge of the United States District Court for the Middle District of Pennsylvania
Clyde Conner, American football wide receiver
Clyde R. Conner, American college football player
Darion Conner, American former linebacker
David Conner, several people
Dennis Conner (born 1942), American yachtsman
Dick Conner, English football player
Doyle Conner (1928-2012), American politician
Eliza Archard Conner (pen name, "Zig"; 1838–1912), American journalist
Elizabeth Marney Conner (1856-?), American educator
Finis Conner, American entrepreneur
Fox Conner (1874–1951), United States Army Major General in World War I
Frank Conner (golfer), American pro golfer
Garlin Murl Conner (1919-1998), United States Army lieutenant
Gary Lee Conner, American guitarist
J. W. Conner, Wisconsin State Assembly
Jack Conner, Scottish footballer
James Conner (disambiguation), multiple people
Jean Conner, American artist
Jimmy Dan Conner, American football shooting guard
John Conner (disambiguation), multiple people
Kavell Conner, Canadian linebacker
Keven Conner ( 1974 – 2003), American R&B singer, member of H-Town
Keyanna Conner, American politician
Lester Conner, American basketball coach
Lois Conner, American photographer
Lycurgus Conner, American politician
Mac Conner, American commercial illustrator and centenarian
Martin Sennet Conner, governor of Mississippi from 1932 to 1936
Maurice Conner, Canadian politician
Mekinges Conner, Native American woman and wife of William Conner
Michael Conner, American science fiction writer
Monte Conner, former Senior Vice President of A&R for Roadrunner Records
Mountifort Conner ( –1880) politician in South Australia, sporting journalist in Victoria and NSW
Nadine Conner, American singer
Pierre Conner (1932–2018), American mathematician
Raymond Conner, American businessman
Richard Conner, Union Army soldier and Medal of Honor recipient
Seth Conner (born 1992), American baseball coach
Snoop Conner (born 2000), American football player
Stanley Conner, American college football coach
Tanner Conner (born 1998), American football player
Tara Conner (born 1985), Miss USA 2006
Van Conner (1967–2023), American musician, member of Screaming Trees
Varise Conner, American fiddler
Walter Thomas Conner (1877-1952), Baptist theologian
William Conner, American trader and interpreter 
William C. Conner, American federal judge
W. W. Conner, American politician
Fictional characters:
The Conners, fictional family in the American television series Roseanne (TV series) and its spinoff

See also
Conner (given name)
Conners, surname
Connor (surname)
O'Conner